The 1983–84 Boston Bruins season was the Bruins' 60th season

Offseason

Regular season

Final standings

Schedule and results

Playoffs
The Bruins lost the Division Semi-Finals (3-0) to the Montreal Canadiens.

Player statistics

Regular season
Scoring

Goaltending

Playoffs
Scoring

Goaltending

Awards and records

Transactions

Draft picks
Boston's draft picks at the 1983 NHL Entry Draft held at the Montreal Forum in Montreal, Quebec.

Farm teams

See also
1983–84 NHL season

References

External links

Boston Bruins seasons
Boston Bruins
Boston Bruins
Adams Division champion seasons
Boston Bruins
Boston Bruins
Bruins
Bruins